The men's 800 metre freestyle event at the 2015 European Games in Baku took place on 26 June at the Aquatic Palace.

Results
The heats were started at 11:30 and 19:09.

References

Men's 800 metre freestyle